The Board of Intermediate and Secondary Education, Sylhet is an autonomous organization responsible for holding public examinations (JSC, S.S.C and H.S.C) in four districts of Sylhet Division. The board was established in 1999.

The present chairman of the board is Rama Bijay Sarker.

District under Sylhet Education Board
Habiganj District
Moulvibazar District
Sunamganj District
Sylhet District

Prominent educational institutions 

 Moulvibazar Government High School

See also
 List of Education Boards in Bangladesh

References

External links
 Official Website
 Education Boards of Bangladesh
 Directorate of Secondary and Higher Education in Bangladesh

Education in Sylhet District
1999 establishments in Bangladesh
Education Board in Bangladesh
Government boards of Bangladesh
Dakshin Surma Upazila